The Scarecrow is a 1982 New Zealand film, also known as Klynham Summer in America. It was directed by Sam Pillsbury based on the 1963 horror novel by New Zealand author Ronald Hugh Morrieson.

Plot
One night a girl is slain in the woods of a small town, two teenagers, Sam and Les, inadvertently cross the killer's path while robbing the hens of Victor the school bully. According to Sam Edwards the film is not as bleak as the novel. Small-town New Zealand in the 1950s is puritanical on the surface but depraved to its depths.

Cast
 Jonathan Smith as Ned Poindexter
 Tracy Mann as Prudence Poindexter
 Daniel McLaren as Les Wilson
 John Carradine as Hubert Salter
 Bruce Allpress as Uncle Athol
 Philip Holder as Constable Ramsbottom
 Stephen Taylor as Herbert Poindexter
 Desmond Kelly as Mr. Poindexter
 Anne Flannery as Mrs. Poindexter
 Denise O'Connell as Angela Potroz
 Jonathan Hardy as Charlie Dabney
 Martyn Sanderson as Ned as Adult (voice)
 Greer Robson as Lynette
Roy Billing as Mr. Potroz
 Greg Naughton as Victor Lynch 
 Mark Hadlow as Sam Finn

References 
Scarecrow: A Film Study Guide by Brian McDonnell (1982, Longman Paul Auckland)  
New Zealand Film 1912–1996 by Helen Martin & Sam Edwards p. 81 (1997, Oxford University Press, Auckland)

External links

 The Scarecrow at NZonScreen (with video extracts)

1982 films
New Zealand horror films
Films based on New Zealand novels
Films directed by Sam Pillsbury
1980s English-language films
1982 directorial debut films